The 1966 Syracuse Orangemen football team represented Syracuse University in the 1966 NCAA University Division football season. The Orangemen were led by 18th-year head coach Ben Schwartzwalder and played their home games at Archbold Stadium in Syracuse, New York. After losing their first two games of the season, Syracuse won the next eight games, finishing the regular season with a record of 8–2 and ranked 16th in the Coaches Poll. They were invited to the 1966 Gator Bowl, where they lost to Tennessee.

Schedule

References

Syracuse
Syracuse Orange football seasons
Lambert-Meadowlands Trophy seasons
Syracuse Orangemen football